Alestopetersius hilgendorfi is a species of African tetras found in the middle Congo River basin in the Democratic Republic of the Congo.

Etmology
The tetra is named in honor of zoologist and paleontologist Franz Hilgendorf (1839-1904), who was the one who established the Petersius  genus in 1894.

References

Paugy, D., 1984. Characidae. p. 140-183. In J. Daget, J.-P. Gosse and D.F.E. Thys van den Audenaerde (eds.) Check-list of the freshwater fishes of Africa (CLOFFA). ORSTOM, Paris and MRAC, Tervuren. Vol. 1.

Alestidae
Fish of Africa
Taxa named by George Albert Boulenger
Fish described in 1899